Iphiclides is a genus of butterflies of the family Papilionidae (swallowtails).

Taxonomy
The genus was described by Jacob Hübner in 1819. It contains three species: Iphiclides podalirius, Iphiclides feisthamelii, and Iphiclides podalirinus.

I. podalirius
Iphiclides podalirius (Linnaeus, 1758), the scarce swallowtail, is found in gardens, fields and open woodlands. It is found in places with sloe thickets and particularly orchards. It is widespread throughout Europe with the exception of the northern parts. Its range extends northwards to Saxony and central Poland and eastwards across Asia Minor and Transcaucasia as far as the Arabian Peninsula, India, and western China. The scarce swallowtail is getting rarer as due to loss of habitat and food plants. It is protected by law in some European countries. It is considered rare or endangered in some provinces of Austria and of indeterminate status throughout Europe.

I. feisthamelii
Iphiclides feisthamelii (Duponchel, 1832), the southern swallowtail, is found on the Iberian Peninsula and in Northwest Africa. The southern swallowtail is sometimes considered a subspecies of I. podalirius.

I. podalirinus
Iphiclides podalirinus (Oberthür, 1890), the Chinese scarce swallowtail, is a little-known species occurring in China, that was also previously considered a subspecies of I. podalirius. It is not known to be threatened but more data is required on this butterfly.

References

External links

 Butterfly Conservation Armenia

 
Butterfly genera
Taxa named by Jacob Hübner